The current Constitution of Poland was founded on 2 April 1997.  Formally known as the Constitution of the Republic of Poland, it replaced the Small Constitution of 1992, the last amended version of the Constitution of the Polish People's Republic, known from December 1989 as the Constitution of the Republic of Poland. It was adopted by the National Assembly of Poland on 2 April 1997, approved by a national referendum on 25 May 1997, promulgated by the President of the Republic on 16 July 1997, and came into effect on 17 October 1997.

Poland has had numerous previous constitutional acts. Historically, the most significant is the Constitution of 3 May 1791.

Current constitution (1997)

New character of the nation
The five years after 1992 were spent in dialogue about the new character of Poland.  The nation had changed significantly since 1952 when the Constitution of the Polish People's Republic was instituted.  A new consensus was needed on how to acknowledge the awkward parts of Polish history; the transformation from a one-party system into a multi-party one and from socialism towards a free market economic system; and the rise of pluralism alongside Poland's historically Roman Catholic culture.

Old and new policies
The attitude toward the past was articulated in the preamble, in which the citizens of Poland established a Republic "Recalling the best traditions of the First and the Second Republic, Obliged to bequeath to future generations all that is valuable from our over one thousand years' heritage ... Mindful of the bitter experiences of the times when fundamental freedoms and human rights were violated in our Homeland, ...".

Many articles were written explicitly to rectify the wrongs of previous governments. Article 21 protects the rights of ownership and inheritance, but the post-World War II PKWN-decreed and implemented land reform was not invalidated. Article 23 thus established the family farm as the basis of the agricultural economy. Article 74 requires public officials to pursue ecologically sound public policy. Articles 39 and 40 prohibit the practices of forced medical experimentation, forbidding torture and corporal punishment, while Articles 50 and 59 acknowledge the inviolability of the home, the right to form trade unions, and to strike.

Tradition versus pluralism
Those involved in drafting the document were not interested in creating a de facto Catholic Poland. That said, nods were given in the direction of the church, to the effect of protecting common morality. For example, in Article 18, marriage is granted the protection of the state, and in Article 53, freedom of religion, religious education, and religious upbringing are protected.

The preamble emphasizes freedom of religion or disbelief: "We, the Polish Nation – all citizens of the Republic, Both those who believe in God as the source of truth, justice, good and beauty, As well as those not sharing such faith but respecting those universal values as arising from other sources...".  Article 25 provides further protection, that public officials "shall be impartial in matters of personal conviction, whether religious or philosophical, or in relation to outlooks on life, and shall ensure their freedom of expression within public life."

Other aspects include the affirmation of the political equality of man and woman in Article 33, and the affirmation of freedom of ethnic minorities to advance and develop their culture, in Article 35.

Preamble

Historical constitutions

Kingdom of Poland and the Polish–Lithuanian Commonwealth

The first major privilege was granted in Košice by Louis Andegavin on September 17, 1374. In order to guarantee the Polish throne for his daughter Jadwiga, he agreed to abolish all but one tax the szlachta was required to pay. The Koszyce Privilege also forbade the king to grant official posts and major Polish castles to foreign knights, and obliged him to pay indemnities to nobles injured or taken captive during a war outside Polish borders.

The privileges granted by Ladislaus II at Brześć Kujawski (April 25, 1425), Jedlnia (March 4, 1430) and Kraków (January 9, 1433) introduced or confirmed the rule known as Neminem captivabimus nisi iure victum which prevented a noble from being arrested unless found guilty. On May 2, 1447, the same king issued the Wilno Privilege which gave the Lithuanian boyars the same rights as those possessed by the Polish szlachta.

In September and October 1454, Casimir IV granted the Cerkwica and Nieszawa Privileges which forbade the king to set new taxes, laws or draft nobles for war unless he had the consent of local diets (sejmiki). These privileges were demanded by the szlachta as a compensation for their participation in the Thirteen Years' War. As a compensation for the unsuccessful incursion on Moldavia which had decimated the szlachta, John Albert granted the Piotrków Privilege on April 26, 1496 which prohibited serfs from leaving their owners' land, and banned city dwellers from buying land.

In the spring of 1505 king Alexander signed a bill adopted by the Diet of Radom known as Nihil novi nisi commune consensu ("Nothing new without a common agreement"). The Nihil novi act transferred legislative power from the king to the Diet (Sejm), or Polish parliament. This date marked the beginning of the First Rzeczpospolita, the period of a szlachta-run "republic".

Until the death of Sigismund Augustus, the last king of the Jagiellonian dynasty, monarchs could only be elected from within the royal family. However, starting from 1573, practically any Polish noble or foreigner of royal blood could become a Polish–Lithuanian monarch. Every newly elected king was required sign two documents – the Pacta conventa ("agreed pacts") – a confirmation of the king's pre-election promises, and Henrican articles (artykuły henrykowskie, named after the first freely elected king, Henry of Valois). The latter document served as a virtual Polish constitution and contained the basic laws of the Commonwealth:
free election of kings;
religious tolerance;
the Diet to be gathered every two years;
foreign policy controlled by the Diet;
a royal advisory council chosen by the Diet;
official posts restricted to Polish and Lithuanian nobles;
taxes and monopolies set up by the Diet only;
nobles' right to disobey the king should he break any of these laws.

Sejm Constitution of 1590

In the 18th century, the introduction of Cardinal Laws in 1768 was an important step towards codifying the existing Polish law.

May Constitution, 1791

			
The Polish Constitution of May 3, 1791 is called the first constitution in Europe by historian Norman Davies. It was instituted by the Government Act (Polish: Ustawa rządowa) adopted on that date by the Sejm (parliament) of the Polish–Lithuanian Commonwealth. It was designed to redress long-standing political defects of the federative Polish–Lithuanian Commonwealth and its Golden Liberty. The Constitution introduced political equality between townspeople and nobility (szlachta) and placed the peasants under the protection of the government, thus mitigating the worst abuses of serfdom. The Constitution abolished pernicious parliamentary institutions such as the liberum veto, which at one time had placed the sejm at the mercy of any deputy who might choose, or be bribed by an interest or foreign power, to undo all the legislation that had been passed by that sejm. The May 3rd Constitution sought to supplant the existing anarchy fostered by some of the country's reactionary magnats, with a more egalitarian and democratic constitutional monarchy.	
	
The adoption of the May 3rd Constitution provoked the active hostility of the Polish Commonwealth's neighbors. In the War in Defense of the Constitution (1792), Poland was betrayed by its Prussian ally Frederick William II and defeated by the Imperial Russia of Catherine the Great, allied with the Targowica Confederation, a cabal of Polish magnates who opposed reforms that might weaken their influence. Despite the defeat, and the subsequent Second Partition of Poland, the May 3rd Constitution influenced later democratic movements in the world. Ultimately, Prussia, Austria and Russia partitioned Poland in 1795.  It remained, after the demise of the Polish Kingdom in 1795, over the next 123 years of Polish partitions, a beacon in the struggle to restore Polish sovereignty.  In the words of two of its co-authors, Ignacy Potocki and Hugo Kołłątaj, it was "the last will and testament of the expiring Fatherland."

19th century

Duchy of Warsaw, 1806
Constitution of the Kingdom of Poland, 1815
Constitution of the Free City of Kraków, 1815

Second Polish Republic (1919–1939)
The Second Polish Republic had three constitutions. They were, in historical order:
Small Constitution, 1919
March Constitution, 1921
April Constitution, 1935

Polish People's Republic (1945–1989)
The Manifesto of the Polish Committee of National Liberation condemned the April Constitution of 1935 as "unlawful and fascist" and stated that the March Constitution of 1921 would be the Polish constitution until a new one could be written. The new constitution was the Small Constitution of 1947, later succeeded by the Constitution of the Polish People's Republic in 1952.

Third Polish Republic (1989–1997)
Prior to the current 1997 Constitution, the country was governed by the Small Constitution of 1992, which amended the main articles of the Constitution of the Polish People's Republic and formed the legal basis of the Polish State between 1992 and 1997.

See also

List of national constitutions
Polish constitutional crisis, 2015

References

Further reading
Chair of History of Polish Law, Jagiellonian University (in Polish)

External links

English text of the Polish Constitution
Polish text of the Polish Constitution
Polish Constitutional Law Constitutions, bibliography, links
Overview 

1997 documents
1997 in law
1997 in Poland
History of Poland (1989–present)
Constitutions of Poland
1997 in politics
April 1997 events in Europe